Alcohol dehydrogenase (nicotinoprotein) (NDMA-dependent alcohol dehydrogenase, nicotinoprotein alcohol dehydrogenase, np-ADH, ethanol:N,N-dimethyl-4-nitrosoaniline oxidoreductase) is an enzyme with systematic name ethanol:acceptor oxidoreductase. This enzyme catalyses the following chemical reaction

 ethanol + acceptor  acetaldehyde + reduced acceptor

This enzyme contains Zn2+.

References

External links 
 

EC 1.1.99